Gepirone is an antidepressant and anxiolytic drug of the azapirone group that was synthesized by Bristol-Myers Squibb in 1986 and has been under development for the treatment of depression but has yet to be marketed. It has been under development in the U.S. in an extended release form (referred to as gepirone ER), but despite completing phase III clinical trials and demonstrating efficacy, it has been rejected multiple times by the Food and Drug Administration (FDA) during the drug approval process. However, in March 2016, the FDA reversed course and ruled favorably on the efficacy of gepirone.

In addition to its antidepressant and anxiolytic properties, gepirone has been found to improve symptoms of sexual dysfunction in men and women. Moreover, the pro-sexual effects appear to be independent of its antidepressant and anxiolytic effects.

Pharmacology

Pharmacodynamics
Like other azapirones, gepirone acts as a selective partial agonist of the 5-HT1A receptor. Unlike its relative buspirone, however, gepirone has greater efficacy in activating the 5-HT1A and has negligible affinity for the D2 receptor (30- to 50-fold lower in comparison to buspirone). However, similarly to buspirone, gepirone metabolizes into 1-(2-pyrimidinyl)piperazine, which is known to act as a potent antagonist of the α2-adrenergic receptor.

History
Gepirone was originally developed by Bristol-Myers Squibb, but was out-licensed to Fabre-Kramer in 1993. The FDA rejected approval for gepirone in 2004. It was submitted for the preregistration (NDA) phase again in May 2007 after adding additional information from clinical trials as the FDA required in 2009. However, in 2012 it once again failed to convince the FDA of its qualities for treating anxiety and depression. In December 2015, the FDA once again gave gepirone a negative review for depression due to concerns of efficacy. However, in March 2016, the FDA reversed its decision and gave gepirone ER a positive review.

During its development it has been called BMY 13805, MJ 13805, Org 33062, and TGFK07AD and it has had two proposed trade names: Travivo and Variza.

See also 
 List of investigational antidepressants

References

External links 
 Gepirone - AdisInsight

5-HT1A agonists
Alpha-2 blockers
Antidepressants
Anxiolytics
Azapirones
Experimental drugs
Glutarimides
Piperazines
Aminopyrimidines